Jaroslav Perner (March 28, 1869 in Týnec nad Labem – June 9, 1947 in Prague) was a Czech paleontologist.

In 1927 Perner became professor of paleontology at the Charles University in Prague. He continued in work started by Joachim Barrande (the Systéme silurien du center de la Bohéme). He was also custodian of the Czech National Museum in Prague.

External links
 Very short biography (in Czech)

1869 births
1947 deaths
Czech paleontologists
Charles University alumni